The Best of Loggins & Messina is a compilation album by singer-songwriter duo Loggins and Messina, released in late 1980. This album was released by their new label, Embassy Records (see 1980 in music).

It consists of 14 of their later recordings and a few of their early hits. However, it omits some of their highest charting songs.

Track listing
"Vahevala" – 4:45 (KL, DL)
"Danny's Song" – 4:14 (KL)
"Nobody But You" (JM)
"Whiskey" (KL)
"House at Pooh Corner" – 4:20 (KL)
"Angry Eyes" – 2:23 (KL, JM)
"Golden Ribbons" (JM)
"My Music" – 3:03 (KL, JM)
"Brighter Days" (KL)
"Watching the River Run" – 3:25 (KL, JM)
"Keep Me In Mind". (JM)
"Peacemaker" (KL, ES, JT)
"I'm Moving On"
"Til The Ends Meet" (KL)

Songwriter credits
KL – Kenny Loggins
JM – Jim Messina
ES – Ed Sanford
JT – John Townsend
DL – Dann Lottermoser

Musical credits
Kenny Loggins (vocals, background vocals, rhythm guitar, harmonica, acoustic guitar)
Jim Messina (vocals, background vocals, lead guitar, mandolin, acoustic guitar, dobro)
Murray MacCleod (vocals)
Ed Sanford (vocals)*
John Townsend (vocals)
Merle Brigante (drums)
Chris Brooks (koto)
Jon Clarke (Horn)
Vince Denham (Saxophone)
Victor Feldman (percussion)
Steve Forman (percussion)
Al Garth (Violin, Horn)
Richard Greene (violin)
Milt Holland (percussion)
Michael Omartian (Keyboards)
David Paich (Keyboards)
Marty Paich (strings)
Mike Rubin (piano)
Dan Roberts (Saxophone)
Larry Sims (Bass)
David Wallace (synthesizer)

Loggins and Messina albums
1980 greatest hits albums
Albums produced by Jim Messina (musician)